Marlon Chaplin is a Canadian singer-songwriter and multi-instrumentalist from Toronto, Ontario. He is known for playing with Broken Bricks, Freeman Dre and the Kitchen Party, Suitcase Sam and Ada Dahli. He currently records and performs as his own self-titled project.

Early life
Marlon was born in Toronto, Ontario. He attended Etobicoke School of the Arts where he formed his band, Broken Bricks with collaborator Luka Kuplowski who now has his own solo project.

Broken Bricks
Broken Bricks released two albums Pasquale and Little Fugitives as well as a number of singles between 2009 and 2012. This culminated in a sold-out show at Lee's Palace at the release of Little Fugitives. The group disbanded in 2014.

Freeman Dre and the Kitchen Party
Chaplin was a regular member of Freeman Dre and the Kitchen Party for many years. He played guitar, piano, bass and drums in the band throughout the band's years and performed on all of their subsequent records. The Kitchen Party was begun by lead-man Andre Flak who created a musical collective known Fedora Upside Down most notably with The Lemon Bucket Orkestra.

Solo career

Wanderer by Trade
Chaplin began a self-titled solo rock and roll project as early as 2014.

His first release Wanderer by Trade was released in 2016. Collaborations on the album featured contributing members of Zeus and Lemon Bucket Orkestra.

Four music videos were released for the album. Carmeline and Skeleton Key were directed by Justin Friesen and In Stars and Conviction were directed by Karly McCloskey.

In 2016 Chaplin released two singles: Fossils and Annabelle + Someone. He released the single Danger, Danger in 2017.

The Circle
In 2018, Chaplin released his first solo full-length LP The Circle.

The first single was Elevation with a music video directed by James Featherstone and Michael Greggain.

The second single was Take Me There with a music video directed by Justine McCloskey.

The third single was A Single Drop with a music video directed by Justin Friesen.

Chaplin released a final single with the title track The Circle for the album with a video directed by Michael Greggain.

Singles release – Spring/Summer 2020
Chaplin released two singles, This Is How You Sleep and Are You Ok? in late spring of 2020. A music video was released for Are You Ok? directed by Justin Friesen on 13 June 2020. The video was shot amongst the COVID-19 pandemic in Toronto.

Singles release – summer 2020 – summer 2021 
Starting 20 June 2020, Chaplin released a new single titled Alternate End, followed by a continuous release of singles.

Synestalgia 
On August 31, 2021, Chaplin released his full-length LP Synestalgia.

Discography

Broken Bricks
 2009: Pasquale, LP
 2011: Little Fugitives, EP
 2012: Fortune Out Of You/It Won't Get You High, Single

Freeman Dre and the Kitchen Party
 2010: Red Door, Second Floor, LP
 2012: Old Town, LP
 2015: Vodka/Pickle, EP
 2017: Reckless Good Intentions, LP

Ada Dahli & the Pallbearers
 2015: Tangents, LP

Suitcase Sam

 2019: Goodnight Riverdale Park, LP

Marlon Chaplin
 2016: Wanderer by Trade, EP
 2016: Fossils/Annabelle + Someone, Single
 2017: Danger, Danger, Single
 2018: The Circle, LP
 2020: This is How You Sleep, Single
 2020: Are You Ok?, Single
 2021: Synestalgia, LP

References

External links

1989 births
Living people
21st-century Canadian multi-instrumentalists
Musicians from Toronto